Lawrence Francis 'Laurie' Pickup (8 March 1916 – 3 June 1942) was an Australian rugby league footballer who played in the 1930s.

Playing career
A product of Marist Bros. Darlinghurst, New South Wales, Pickup in the mid 1930s was a talented Eastern Suburbs junior that featured in first grade between 1938–1939.

Pickup played five-eighth for Eastern Suburbs in the 1938 grand final that was defeated by Canterbury-Bankstown 19–6.

War service
Pickup enlisted in the RAAF during World War Two in 1941. On 3 June 1942, Leading Aircraftman Pickup was killed when the Avro Anson he was flying in conducted a forced landing into the Great Australian Bight off Kangaroo Island, Australia. All 4 on board died in the crash.

References

1916 births
1942 deaths
Australian military personnel killed in World War II
Royal Australian Air Force airmen
Royal Australian Air Force personnel of World War II
Rugby league five-eighths
Rugby league players from Sydney
Sydney Roosters players